Charoun or Sharoun, is a Lebanese village located in the Aley District. Charoun is 31 kilometers away from Beirut and neighbors the town Saoufar. Its name derives from the Aramaic languages meaning the agricultural hills. Charoun is from the Jurd region, with an 1350 m altitude. It accounts two schools, one public school and one private school. Charoun has two industries with 5 or more workers. Charoun is one of the biggest villages in the Aley District, (10.5 square km), and wholly Druze.

Climate

The town receives heavy snow during the wintertime, which may reach a level higher than one metre high after particularly bad storms. Temperatures usually drop to less than zero during the months of December and January. Charoun is also known for its abundance in water like the Nahr Charoun and the historical Ain Bou-Freez, a 1030-year-old natural fountain. It also holds an important place in the Druze faith, as it contains two Druze maqams: Al maqam al shariff and the Sitt Sara maqam.

Families

There are three major families in Charoun: Ahmadie, El Sayegh and Al-Banna. There are also three minor families: Dimashqi, Abdel-Khalek and Abou Hamdan.  It's  the hometown of many important persons in Lebanon: the writer Nidal Ahmadie, the composer Ziad Ahmadie, the urologist Dr Nabil Ahmadie and Wajdi Sayegh, the first martyr in the Lebanese National Resistance Front for the Syrian Socialist National Party.

External links
Charoun, Localiban 

Populated places in Aley District
Druze communities in Lebanon